The Spies of Warsaw is a 2008 spy novel by Alan Furst about espionage involving the major nations shortly before World War II competing for influence and control over the future of Poland.  The story starts in October 1937 and ends in May 1938, with a one paragraph description outlining the future of the two lead characters.

Adaptation
The book was adapted for television in 2013, with the title Spies of Warsaw, a co-production of TVP1, BBC Four, BBC America, and ARTE, and premiered in January in the United Kingdom and in April in the United States. It starred David Tennant as the protagonist Colonel Jean-François Mercier and Janet Montgomery as his love interest Anna Skarbek. The two-part drama received some positive reviews in the UK, especially for the script and acting, although The Guardian described it as "pallid as much of the washed-out photography". As in other Alan Furst novels, the fictional Parisian restaurant Brasserie Heininger serves as one of the settings for dialogue.

References

External links
 

Novels by Alan Furst
2008 American novels
American spy novels
American historical novels
Novels set during World War II
Novels set in Poland
Fiction set in 1937
American novels adapted into television shows
Fiction set in 1938